Hassan Ayat (24 June 1938 – 5 August 1981) was an Iranian politician. He was member of Parliament of Iran in first assembly after the Iranian Revolution and also member of Assembly of Experts for Constitution.

Early life
He was born on 24 June 1938 in Najafabad, Isfahan. After spending time in studying elementary and secondary schools in Najafabad, He moved to Tehran for higher education and was graduated from University of Tehran. He was a classmate with Abulhassan Banisadr. He was journalist from 1958 to 1965 and was worked in Ettela'at.

Career
Ayat was a member of Zahmatkeshan Party before Iranian Revolution but resigned from the party. Ayat joined the Islamic Republican Party and became a member of its central committee. He was elected as a member of Assembly of Experts for Constitution in Constitutional Convention election. After that, Ayat was elected as a member of Parliament from Tehran. He was one of the main leaders in impeachment of President Abulhassan Banisadr.
He was killed when he was on his way to submit the hard evidence by some in front of his house.

Assassination
On 5 August 1981, five days after Hafte Tir bombing, Ayat was assassinated by People's Mujahedin of Iran in front of his house by two men who then escaped on motorcycles.

References and notes

1938 births
1981 deaths
Deputies of Tehran, Rey, Shemiranat and Eslamshahr
University of Tehran alumni
People from Najafabad
Central Council of the Islamic Republican Party members
People of the Iranian Revolution
Iranian revolutionaries
Members of the 1st Islamic Consultative Assembly
Toilers Party of the Iranian Nation politicians
People assassinated by the People's Mojahedin Organization of Iran
Members of the Assembly of Experts for Constitution
Faculty of Letters and Humanities of the University of Tehran alumni
Faculty of Social Sciences of the University of Tehran alumni